The Neftchi Baku 2011–12 season is Neftchi Baku's twentieth Azerbaijan Premier League season, and their first season under manager Boyukagha Hajiyev.

Squad 

 (captain)

Transfers

Summer

In:

Out:

Winter

In:

Out:

Competitions

2011-12 Azerbaijan Premier League

Results summary

Results by round

Results

League table

2011-12 Azerbaijan Premier League Championship Group

Results summary

Results by round

Results

Championship group

2011-12 Azerbaijan Cup Results

Final

UEFA Champions League

Qualifying phase

Kadyrov Cup

Group stage

Match for third place

Squad statistics

Appearances and goals

|-
|colspan="14"|Players who appeared for Neftchi no longer at the club:

|}

Goal scorers

Disciplinary record

Monthly awards

Annual awards

Team kit
These are the 2011–12 Neftchi Baku kits.

|
|

References

External links 
 Neftchi Baku at Soccerway.com

Neftchi Baku
Neftçi PFK seasons